Anne Penesco, née Anne Crépin is a French musicologist, academic and biographer.

Career 
Holder of a State doctorate in musicology, Anne Penesco was a lecturer at the Metz University, then lecturer at the Sorbonne Musicology Institute, before becoming a full professor at the universities in 1993 when she was already teaching at Lumière University Lyon 2. Within the Department of Music and Musicology of the Faculty of Arts, Language Sciences and Arts, she holds the pedagogical responsibility for the master's degree in research in arts (music and musicology).

She also holds a doctorate in aesthetics and art science, as well as degrees in classical literature, Romanian and Italian.

Publications 
Biographies
 Mounet-Sully : l'homme aux cent cœurs d'homme, éditions du Cerf, series "Histoire", Paris, 2005, 620 p. + 16 p. of illustrated plates, 
 Paul Mounet : le tragédien qui parlait aux étoiles, éditions du Cerf, series "Biographie", Paris, 2009, 506 p.,, 

Musicology
 Les Instruments du quatuor : technique et interprétation, éditions La Flûte de Pan, Paris, 1986, 224 p., 
 Les instruments à archet dans les musiques du XXe siècle, éditions Honoré Champion, series "Musique-musicologie" issue21-22, Paris, 1992, 399 p., 
 Du baroque à l'époque contemporaine : aspects des instruments à archet (selected writings chosen and presented by Anne Penesco), éditions Honoré Champion, series "Musique-musicologie" issue 23, Paris, 1993, 192 p., 
 Études sur la musique française : autour de Debussy, Ravel et Paul Le Flem (selected writings chosen and presented by Anne Penesco), Presses universitaires de Lyon, series "Cahiers du Centre de recherches musicologiques", Lyon, 1994, 107 p., 
 Itinéraires de la musique française : théorie, pédagogie et création (selected writings chosen and presented by Anne Penesco), Presses universitaires de Lyon, series "Cahiers du Centre de recherches musicologiques", Lyon, 1996, 234 p., 
 Défense et illustration de la virtuosité (selected writings chosen and presented by Anne Penesco), Presses universitaires de Lyon, series "Cahiers du Centre de recherches musicologiques", Lyon, 1997, 213 p., 
 Georges Enesco et l'âme roumaine (with a foreword by Yehudi Menuhin), Presses universitaires de Lyon, series "Cahiers du Centre de recherches musicologiques", Lyon, 1999, 90 p., 
 Mounet-Sully et la partition intérieure, Presses universitaires de Lyon, series "Cahiers du Centre de recherches musicologiques", Lyon, 2000, 149 p., 

Copublications
 Charles Wagner, L'homme est une espérance de Dieu : anthologie (selected writings chosen and presented by Anne Penesco and Geoffroy de Turckheim, with a foreword by Patrick Cabanel), coedition Van Dieren et Église réformée de la Bastille Foyer de l'âme, series "Débats" issue 8, Paris, 2007, 173 p.,

References

External links 
 Anne Penesco on IdRef
 Anne Penesco on Symétrie
 Mounet-Sully, Paul Mounet… Entretien avec Anne Penesco, auteur passionné on mounetsully.com
 Anne Penesco on cnrs.fr
 Anne Penesco Proust et le violon intérieur on Musicology.org
 Anne Penesco on Encyclopedia Universalis

20th-century French musicologists
Women musicologists
Academic staff of the University of Lorraine
French biographers
Living people
Year of birth missing (living people)
Women biographers
20th-century French women writers
French women historians
Academic staff of the University of Lyon